Mentor Exempted Village School District, also known as Mentor Public Schools, is a school district headquartered in Mentor, Ohio. It serves Mentor, Mentor-on-the-Lake, a portion of Kirtland Hills, a portion of Concord Township, and a portion of Chardon Township.  it had the district had over 7,700 students and fewer than 1,000 employees.

Schools

Early childhood
Integrated Preschool (7090 Hopkins Rd, Mentor)

Elementary schools
Bellflower Elementary School (6655 Reynolds Rd, Mentor)
Fairfax Elementary School (6465 Curtis Rd, Mentor)
Hopkins Elementary School (7565 Hopkins Rd, Mentor)
Lake Elementary School (7625 Pinehurst Dr, Mentor-on-the-Lake)
Orchard Hollow Elementary School (8700 Hendricks Rd, Mentor)
Ridge Elementary School (7860 Johnnycake Ridge Rd, Mentor)
Sterling Morton Elementary School (9292 Jordan Dr, Mentor)

Middle schools
Memorial Middle School (8979 Mentor Ave, Mentor)
Shore Middle School (5670 Hopkins Rd, Mentor)

High schools
Mentor High School (6477 Center St, Mentor)

Special
CARES (School for students with autism, ages 6 to 22) (5028 Forest Rd, Mentor)

References

External links
 Mentor Public Schools

School districts in Ohio
Education in Lake County, Ohio